Tinatin is a Georgian feminine name meaning "sunbeam."

Other forms of name Tinatin used in Georgian are: Tina, Tika, Tiko, Tiniko and Felicia 

It may refer to:
Princess Tinatin of Arabia, a character in The Knight in the Panther's Skin
Tinatin Gurieli, Georgian queen consort
Tinatin Lekveishvili, Georgian backstroke swimmer
Tinatin Chulukhadze, Georgian singer
Tinatin Kandelaki, Georgian journalist and public figure in Russia
Tinatin Passatoia, Georgian model, singer and TV host

Notes

Georgian feminine given names